Ventriculectomy, or ventricular reduction, is a type of operation in cardiac surgery to reduce enlargement of the heart from cardiomyopathy or ischemic aneurysm formation. In these procedures, part of the ventricular wall is resected.A Batista procedure is a partial left ventriculectomy that is used to treat advanced heart failure. This procedure is not widely used because outcomes are often unsatisfactory.

See also
 Dor procedure

References 

Cardiac surgery